Siegfried Sageder (born 30 July 1957) is an Austrian rower. He competed in the men's quadruple sculls event at the 1980 Summer Olympics.

References

1957 births
Living people
Austrian male rowers
Olympic rowers of Austria
Rowers at the 1980 Summer Olympics
Rowers from Linz